Jokers and Queens is a collaborative album released by Australian musicians Marcia Hines and Jon English, in July 1982. The album features 3 original and 3 covers and it peaked at number 36 on the Australian Kent Music Report.

Background
Jon English and Hines had worked together in the 1973/74 Australian production of Jesus Christ Superstar In 1981, English had toured the UK and Scandinavia with a number of Hines' band members.

Track listing
All tracks composed by Charlie Hull and Jon English; except where indicated
Side one
"Jokers and Queens" 	
"Ain't Gonna Run" 
“I Heard it Through the Grapevine” (Norman Whitfield, Barrett Strong)
Side two	
"This Time" 	
"You Were on My Mind" (Sylvia Fricker)	
"You've Lost That Lovin' Feeling" (Phil Spector, Barry Mann, Cynthia Weil)

Weekly charts

References

External links

1982 albums
Marcia Hines albums
Jon English albums
Collaborative albums